Sorin Adrian Iodi (born 12 June 1976 in Sighetu Marmaţiei) is a Romanian former football player.

Club career
Iodi started his football career at Olimpia Satu Mare.

He played 113 matches for this team and scored 5 goals. In 1999, he was transferred to Gloria Bistriţa. Iodi played just half of a season at Gloria and he was sold to Dinamo București with whom he won the champion title in the 1999–2000 season.

In 2001, he was sent to Poiana Câmpina, which was at that time Dinamo's satellite team. He returned to Dinamo București in 2002. Iodi played 11 matches and he was loaned to FC Naţional București.

In 2003, he played one match for Dinamo, team which became champion in the 2003–2004 season, and was transferred to Gloria Bistriţa. where he played until 2005, when he moved to the Liga II team, U Cluj. In the 2006–2007 season Sorin Iodi promoted with his team in Liga I. Since then he played for CS Otopeni but became free agent in the summer of 2008.

Between August 2009 and 2011 he played for Gloria Bistriţa, until his retirement.

External links
 

1976 births
Living people
People from Sighetu Marmației
Romanian footballers
Association football defenders
Liga I players
Liga II players
FC Olimpia Satu Mare players
ACF Gloria Bistrița players
FC Dinamo București players
FCM Câmpina players
FC Progresul București players
FC Universitatea Cluj players
CS Otopeni players
CS Minaur Baia Mare (football) players